Mélanie Pain is a French indie pop singer from Caen. She performs with the band Nouvelle Vague as well as being a solo artist.

Biography
Hailing from Aix-en-Provence, Pain studied political sciences before moving to Paris to work in a web agency, and then a design agency. Not originally intending to be a singer, a demo she had recorded vocals on for a friend accidentally found its way into the hands of Nouvelle Vague. Subsequently, she has toured for five years with the band.

She sings in both French and English, after years of covering English songs for Nouvelle Vague. Her influences include The Pixies, Sonic Youth, PJ Harvey and Nick Drake.

In April 2009, Pain released her first solo album entitled My Name featuring artists such as Julien Doré, Phoebe Killdeer and Thomas Dybdahl.

Discography
My Name (2009)
Bye Bye Manchester (2012)
Parachute (2016)

With Nouvelle Vague

Singles
 This is Not a Love Song
 Teenage Kicks

Albums
 Bande à Part

References

External links

English-language singers from France
French women singers
Living people
Year of birth missing (living people)
Love Da Records artists